Henry Wagner may refer to:

 Henry F. Wagner (died 1943), American judge
 Henry Michell Wagner (1792–1870), Church of England clergyman
 Henry N. Wagner (1927–2012), professor in nuclear medicine
 Henry Raup Wagner (1862–1957), American book collector and bibliographer

See also
Henry Wagener (1891–1979), American businessman, farmer, and politician